Alfred Holmes White (April 28, 1873  – August 25, 1953) was a chemical engineer at the University of Michigan.

Biography
He was born in Peoria, Illinois to Samuel Holmes White and Jennie McLaren. He married Rebecca Mason Downey on July 28, 1903, and had two children.

He led the university's chemical engineering department to great heights of prestige, for over 40 years, beginning with its founding in 1898.  His earliest academic job was at the University of Illinois, from 1893 to 1896, after which he joined the University of Michigan the next year, and rose to become a full professor by 1911. He was later made an emeritus professor.

His published works include The Disintegration of Cement Floors and Sidewalks and Studies in the Manufacture of Coal Gas, both in 1909.

References

Further reading
Snippet of a bio of him from the Journal of Engineering Education, Volume 32, 1941.
—contains an illustration of him

American chemical engineers
1872 births
1953 deaths
University of Michigan faculty
University of Illinois faculty